Lindsey Gort (born April 24, 1984) is an American actress. She is known for her portrayals of Samantha Jones on CW's The Carrie Diaries and Amy Quinn on the legal drama series All Rise.

Career 
Gort was born in Scottsdale, Arizona. She got involved in the local theater at a young age and her first appearance was in 2009 in a short drama titled Goodbye horses.

In 2010, she starred in the drama thriller Forgotten Pills and the TV movie Wing Bitches. Gort appeared in a minor role in the 2013 action film 2 Guns.

Her first major break came in 2013, when after being turned down for the role twice, she was cast as a young Samantha Jones in the Sex and the City prequel series "The Carrie Diaries". The older and previous version of the character from Sex and the City was played by Kim Cattrall. Cattrall congratulated Gort on Twitter for winning the role and also offered her some advice on playing the character.

In March 2015, Gort joined the dark-comedy sitcom series Impastor in a recurring role of Ashlee. During 2015, she also starred in a Christmas themed TV movie called How Sarah Got Her Wings.

In 2016, she starred in the CBS TV comedy movie Real Good People. In September 2017, Gort was cast as the DC comics character Detective Amy Rohrbach on the superhero show Titans. Her appearance on the show was short-lived as the character was killed off in the second episode of the series.

In late 2019, Gort was cast as Amy Quinn on the CBS legal drama series All Rise. Gort made recurring appearances throughout the first season of the show and was subsequently promoted to series regular for the second season of the series. She returned in the show's third season.

Gort has guest starred on such shows as Lucifer, Baby Daddy, Modern Family and American Housewife''''. She starred in TV movie Love is a Piece of Cake'' in 2020.

Personal life 
Gort married her boyfriend Beau Laughlin in July 2015 in a ceremony at The Paramour Mansion in Silver Lake, California.

Filmography

Film

Television

References

External links 

 

Living people
1984 births
American film actresses
American television actresses
21st-century American actresses
Actresses from Scottsdale, Arizona
American Idol participants